Myxodes cristatus, the sailfin clinid, is a species of clinid native to the Pacific coast of South America from central to southern Chile.

References

cristatus
Fish described in 1836
Taxa named by Achille Valenciennes
Endemic fauna of Chile